The 2018–19 curling season began in August 2018 and ended in May 2019.

Note: In events with two genders, the men's tournament winners will be listed before the women's tournament winners.

World Curling Federation events

Championships

Qualification events

Curling World Cup

Curling Canada events

Championships

Other events

World Curling Tour

Teams
See: List of teams on the 2018–19 World Curling Tour

''Grand Slam events in bold.

Men's events

Women's events

Mixed doubles events

WCT rankings

Money list

Notes

References

External links
World Curling Tour Home
Season of Champions Home

2018-19
2018-19
Seasons in curling